Staincross and Mapplewell railway station was one of three stations built on the Barnsley Coal Railway and opened when that line was completed in 1882. The station was situated adjacent to the main Wakefield road (A61), slightly to the east of Staincross, on the edge of the present day Athersley estate. It was about 1 mile east of Mapplewell. The station was situated between Stairfoot and Notton and Royston.

The railway arrived in the area with the opening of the first section of the Barnsley Coal Railway but the stations were opened, with the completion of the line on 1 September 1882. Staincross and Mapplewell consisted of two flanking platforms with access from the road bridge.

The station was closed on 22 September 1930. It is referred to as Staincross for Mapplewell in the July 1922 issue of Bradshaw's Railway Guide.

References

 Dow, George, "Great Central", Vol. 2 (Dominion of Watkin)(1962). Loco. Publishing Co., London. 

Disused railway stations in Barnsley
Railway stations in Great Britain opened in 1882
Railway stations in Great Britain closed in 1930